1974–75 Hong Kong FA Cup was the first staging of the Hong Kong FA Cup. 

The competition started on 23 March 1975 with 13 Hong Kong First Division clubs and 3 other teams from Second and Third Division.

Teams
 Caroline Hill
 Eastern
 Happy Valley
 Rangers
 Jardines
 Kowloon Motor Bus (From the Second Division League)
 Kui Tan (From the Third Division League)
 Kwong Wah
 Mackinnons
 Seiko
 South China
 Telephone
 Tsuen Wan (From the Second Division League)
 Tung Sing
 Urban Services
 Yuen Long

Fixtures and results
All times are Hong Kong Time (UTC+8).

Bracket

Final

First Leg

Second Leg

References
 HKFA Website, 足總盃回顧(二) 

Hong Kong FA Cup
Hong Kong Fa Cup
Fa Cup